Derek Neville Lester Stroud (11 February 1930 – 2015) was an English professional footballer who played as a winger.

References

1930 births
2015 deaths
People from Wimborne Minster
Footballers from Dorset
English footballers
Association football wingers
Wimborne Town F.C. players
Poole Town F.C. players
AFC Bournemouth players
Grimsby Town F.C. players
Dorchester Town F.C. players
Portland United F.C. players
Ringwood Town F.C. players
English Football League players